Charadraula cassandra is a moth of the family Autostichidae. It is found in Romania and on Crete and Cyprus, as well as in Syria.

References

Moths described in 1967
Holcopogoninae
Moths of Europe